The 2022 Cincinnati Reds season was the 153rd season for the franchise in Major League Baseball, and their 20th at Great American Ball Park in Cincinnati.

On December 2, 2021, Commissioner of Baseball Rob Manfred announced a lockout of players, following expiration of the collective bargaining agreement (CBA) between the league and the Major League Baseball Players Association (MLBPA). On March 10, 2022, the MLB and MLBPA agreed to a new collective bargaining agreement, thus ending the lockout. Opening Day was played on April 7. Although MLB previously announced that several series would be cancelled due to the lockout, the agreement provides for a 162-game season, with originally canceled games to be made up via doubleheaders.

The Reds finished the season 62-100, tied for fourth in the NL Central. It was their first 100-loss season since 1982 and their 2nd in franchise history.

Offseason

Lockout 

The expiration of the league's collective bargaining agreement (CBA) with the Major League Baseball Players Association occurred on December 1, 2021 with no new agreement in place. As a result, the team owners voted unanimously to lockout the players stopping all free agency and trades. 

The parties came to an agreement on a new CBA on March 10, 2022.

Rule changes 
Pursuant to the new CBA, several new rules were instituted for the 2022 season. The National League will adopt the designated hitter full-time, a draft lottery will be implemented, the postseason will expand from ten teams to twelve, and advertising patches will appear on player uniforms and helmets for the first time.

Transactions 
After the lockout, the Reds went on a fire sale. The Reds let their outfielder Nick Castellanos sign with the Philadelphia Phillies and placed starting pitcher Wade Miley on waivers and was picked up by the Chicago Cubs. The Reds also traded many players during this. The Reds traded pitcher Amir Garrett to the Kansas City Royals, starting pitcher Sonny Gray to the Minnesota Twins, catcher Tucker Barnhart to the Detroit Tigers, and both infielder Eugenio Suárez and outfielder Jesse Winker to the Seattle Mariners. Reds owner Bob Castellini was criticized for this and Reds fans protested and asked him to sell the team.

Regular season

The start of the season
The Reds' 2022 started off historically bad. Through the first 25 games, the Reds won only 3 games. They tie with the 2003 Detroit Tigers as the worst start to a season through 25 games at 3–22 behind the 1988 Baltimore Orioles who started 2–23 including a 0–21 start.

Standings

National League Central

National League Wild Card

Game Log

|- style="background:#bfb;"
| 1 || April 7 || @ Braves || 6–3 || Mahle (1–0) || Fried (0–1) || Santillan (1) || Truist Park || 40,545 || 1–0 || W1
|- style="background:#fbb;" 
| 2 || April 8 || @ Braves || 6–7 || Morton (1–0) || Sanmartin (0–1) || — || Truist Park || 40,234 || 1–1 || L1
|- style="background:#fbb;" 
| 3 || April 9 || @ Braves || 1–2 || Wright (1–0) || Gutiérrez (0–1) || Smith (1) || Truist Park || 40,310 || 1–2 || L2
|- style="background:#bfb;" 
| 4 || April 10 || @ Braves || 6–3 || Greene (1–0) || Anderson (0–1) || Warren (1) || Truist Park || 38,233 || 2–2 || W1
|- style="background:#fbb;" 
| 5 || April 12 || Guardians || 5–10 || Stephan (1–0) || Strickland (0–1) || — || Great American Ball Park || 43,036 || 2–3 || L1
|- style="background:#fbb;" 
| 6 || April 13 || Guardians || 3–7 || Morgan (1–0) || Lodolo (0–1) || — || Great American Ball Park || 10,976 || 2–4 || L2
|- style="background:#fbb;" 
| 7 || April 14 || @ Dodgers || 3–9 || Treinen (1–1) || Wilson (0–1) || — || Dodger Stadium || 52,955 || 2–5 || L3
|- style="background:#fbb;" 
| 8 || April 15 || @ Dodgers || 1–3 || Anderson (1–0) || Gutiérrez (0–2) || Kimbrel (2) || Dodger Stadium || 51,891 || 2–6 || L4
|- style="background:#fbb;" 
| 9 || April 16 || @ Dodgers || 2–5 || Phillips (1–0) || Greene (1–1) || Hudson (1) || Dodger Stadium || 51,059 || 2–7 || L5
|- style="background:#fbb;" 
| 10 || April 17 || @ Dodgers || 1–9 || Heaney (1–0) || Mahle (1–1) || — || Dodger Stadium || 41,167 || 2–8 || L6
|- style="background:#fbb;" 
| 11 || April 18 || @ Padres || 1–4 || Manaea (2–1) || Lodolo (0–2) || Rogers (5) || Petco Park || 31,121 || 2–9 || L7
|- style="background:#fbb;" 
| 12 || April 19 || @ Padres || 2–6 || Musgrove (2–0) || Sanmartin (0–2) || — || Petco Park || 31,313 || 2–10 || L8
|- style="background:#fbb;"
| 13 || April 20 || @ Padres || 0–6 || Gore (1–0) || Gutiérrez (0–3) || — || Petco Park || 29,359 || 2–11 || L9
|- style="background:#fbb;" 
| 14 || April 22 || Cardinals || 2–4 || Matz (2–1) || Greene (1–2) || Gallegos (4) || Great American Ball Park || 20,470 || 2–12 || L10
|- style="background:#fbb;" 
| 15 || April 23 || Cardinals || 0–5 || Hudson (1–1) || Mahle (1–2) || — || Great American Ball Park || 28,598 || 2–13 || L11
|- style="background:#bfb;" 
| 16 || April 24 || Cardinals || 4–1 || Lodolo (1–2) || Wainwright (2–2) || Sims (1) || Great American Ball Park || 23,124 || 3–13 || W1
|- style="background:#fbb;" 
| 17 || April 26 || Padres || 6–9 || Musgrove (3–0) || Sanmartin (0–3) || Suárez (1) || Great American Ball Park || 10,056 || 3–14 || L1
|- style="background:#fbb;" 
| 18 || April 27 || Padres || 5–8 || Gore (2–0) || Gutiérrez (0–4) || Rogers (6) || Great American Ball Park || 9,192 || 3–15 || L2
|- style="background:#fbb;" 
| 19 || April 28 || Padres || 5–7 || Martinez (1–2) || Mahle (1–3) || Rogers (7) || Great American Ball Park || 10,449 || 3–16 || L3
|- style="background:#fbb;" 
| 20 || April 29 || @ Rockies || 4–10 || Senzatela (2–1) || Greene (1–3) || — || Coors Field || 30,206 || 3–17 || L4
|- style="background:#fbb;" 
| 21 || April 30 || @ Rockies || 3–4 || Kuhl (3–0) || Warren (0–1) || Bard (6) || Coors Field || 32,179 || 3–18 || L5
|-

|- style="background:#fbb;" 
| 22 || May 1 || @ Rockies || 1–10 || Freeland (1–3) || Sanmartin (0–4) || — || Coors Field || 32,574 || 3–19 || L6
|- style="background:#fbb;" 
| 23 || May 3 || @ Brewers || 3–6 || Woodruff (3–1) || Mahle (1–4) || Williams (2) || American Family Field || 21,961 || 3–20 || L7
|- style="background:#fbb;" 
| 24 || May 4 || @ Brewers || 4–18 || Peralta (1–1) || Gutiérrez (0–5) || — || American Family Field || 25,413 || 3–21 || L8
|- style="background:#fbb;" 
| 25 || May 5 || @ Brewers || 5–10 || Houser (3–2) || Greene (1–4) || — || American Family Field || 21,715 || 3–22 || L9
|- style="background:#bbb;" 
| — || May 6 || Pirates || colspan=8| Postponed (rain); Makeup: July 7
|- style="background:#bfb;" 
| 26 || May 7  || Pirates || 9–2 || Sims (1–0) || Crowe (1–2) || — || Great American Ball Park || 9,267 || 4–22 || W1
|- style="background:#fbb;" 
| 27 || May 7  || Pirates || 5–8 || Hembree (2–0) || Diehl (0–1) || Bednar (3) || Great American Ball Park || 21,448 || 4–23 || L1
|- style="background:#bfb;" 
| 28 || May 8 || Pirates || 7–3 || Warren (1–1) || Peters (3–1) || — || Great American Ball Park || 17,623 || 5–23 || W1
|- style="background:#bfb;"
| 29 || May 9 || Brewers || 10–5 || Cessa (1–0) || Woodruff (3–2) || — || Great American Ball Park || 10,046 || 6–23 || W2
|- style="background:#fbb;" 
| 30 || May 10 || Brewers || 4–5 || Peralta (2–1) || Greene (1–5) || Hader (12) || Great American Ball Park || 10,445 || 6–24 || L1
|- style="background:#bfb;" 
| 31 || May 11 || Brewers || 14–11 || Díaz (1–0) || Houser (3–3) || — || Great American Ball Park || 11,851 || 7–24 || W1
|- style="background:#bfb;" 
| 32 || May 12 || @ Pirates || 4–0 || Overton (1–0) || Brubaker (0–3) || — || PNC Park || 9,470 || 8–24 || W2
|- style="background:#bfb;" 
| 33 || May 13 || @ Pirates || 8–2 || Mahle (2–4) || Keller (0–5) || — || PNC Park || 12,588 || 9–24 || W3
|- style="background:#fbb;" 
| 34 || May 14 || @ Pirates || 1–3 || Thompson (2–3) || Castillo (0–1) || Bednar (6) || PNC Park || 12,959 || 9–25 || L1
|- style="background:#fbb;" 
| 35 || May 15 || @ Pirates || 0–1 || Stratton (2–1) || Greene (1–6) || Bednar (7) || PNC Park || 10,559 || 9–26 || L2
|- style="background:#bfb;" 
| 36 || May 17 || @ Guardians || 5–4  || Warren (2–1) || Sandlin (3–2) || Díaz (1) || Progressive Field || 12,916 || 10–26 || W1
|- style="background:#bbb;" 
| — || May 18 || @ Guardians || colspan=8| Postponed (rain); Makeup: May 19
|- style="background:#bfb;" 
| 37 || May 19 || @ Guardians || 4–2 || Cessa (2–0) || Stephan (2–1) || Santillan (2) || Progressive Field || 8,510 || 11–26 || W2
|- style="background:#fbb;" 
| 38 || May 20 || @ Blue Jays || 1–2 || Ryu (1–0) || Castillo (0–2) || Romano (13) || Rogers Centre || 29,300 || 11–27 || L1
|- style="background:#fbb;" 
| 39 || May 21 || @ Blue Jays || 1–3 || Manoah (5–1) || Cessa (2–1) || Romano (14) || Rogers Centre || 39,393 || 11–28 || L2
|- style="background:#bfb;" 
| 40 || May 22 || @ Blue Jays || 3–2 || Díaz (2–0) || García (0–3) || Warren (2) || Rogers Centre || 42,323 || 12–28 || W1
|- style="background:#fbb;" 
| 41 || May 23 || Cubs || 4–7 || Smyly (2–5) || Gutiérrez (0–6) || Robertson (6) || Great American Ball Park || 12,029 || 12–29 || L1
|- style="background:#fbb;" 
| 42 || May 24 || Cubs || 4–11 || Stroman (2–4) || Mahle (2–5) || Gsellman (1) || Great American Ball Park || 14,386 || 12–30 || L2
|- style="background:#bfb;" 
| 43 || May 25 || Cubs || 4–3 || Castillo (1–2) || Hendricks (2–5) || Strickland (1) || Great American Ball Park || 11,417 || 13–30 || W1
|- style="background:#bfb;" 
| 44 || May 26 || Cubs || 20–5 || Greene (2–6) || Steele (1–5) || — || Great American Ball Park || 13,578 || 14–30 || W2
|- style="background:#bfb;" 
| 45 || May 27 || Giants || 5–1 || Ashcraft (1–0) || Rodón (4–4) || Warren (3) || Great American Ball Park || 19,000 || 15–30 || W3
|- style="background:#bfb;" 
| 46 || May 28 || Giants || 3–2 || Gutiérrez (1–6) || Wood (3–4) || Santillan (3) || Great American Ball Park || 26,655 || 16–30 || W4
|- style="background:#fbb;" 
| 47 || May 29 || Giants || 4–6 || Brebbia (3–0) || Warren (2–2) || — || Great American Ball Park || 20,439 || 16–31 || L1
|- style="background:#bfb;" 
| 48 || May 31 || @ Red Sox || 2–1 || Castillo (2–2) || Wacha (3–1) || Santillan (4) || Fenway Park || 28,577 || 17–31 || W1
|-

|- style="background:#fbb;" 
| 49 || June 1 || @ Red Sox || 1–7 || Whitlock (2–1) || Greene (2–7) || — || Fenway Park || 30,219 || 17–32 || L1
|- style="background:#bfb;" 
| 50 || June 2 || Nationals || 8–1 || Ashcraft (2–0) || Adon (1–9) || — || Great American Ball Park || 12,799 || 18–32 || W1
|- style="background:#fbb;" 
| 51 || June 3 || Nationals || 5–8 || Gray (6–4) || Minor (0–1) || Rainey (6) || Great American Ball Park || 19,032 || 18–33 || L1
|- style="background:#fbb;" 
| 52 || June 4 || Nationals || 8–10 || Finnegan (2–1) || Strickland (0–2) || Rainey (7) || Great American Ball Park || 23,128 || 18–34 || L2
|- style="background:#fbb;"
| 53 || June 5 || Nationals || 4–5 || Corbin (2–8) || Castillo (2–3) || Cishek (1) || Great American Ball Park || 16,380 || 18–35 || L3
|- style="background:#bfb;" 
| 54 || June 6 || Diamondbacks || 7–0  || Greene (3–7) || Bumgarner (2–5) || — || Great American Ball Park || 9,485 || 19–35 || W1
|- style="background:#bfb;"
| 55 || June 7 || Diamondbacks || 14–8 || Ashcraft (3–0) || Gilbert (0–3) || — || Great American Ball Park || 11,512 || 20–35 || W2
|- style="background:#fbb;" 
| 56 || June 8 || Diamondbacks || 0–7 || Kelly (5–3) || Minor (0–2) || — || Great American Ball Park || 11,957 || 20–36 || L1
|- style="background:#fbb;" 
| 57 || June 9 || Diamondbacks || 4–5 || Melancon (2–6) || Santillan (0–1) || Kennedy (4) || Great American Ball Park || 13,167 || 20–37 || L2
|- style="background:#fbb;"
| 58 || June 10 || @ Cardinals || 0–2 || Pallante (2–0) || Castillo (2–4) || Helsley (4) || Busch Stadium || 45,009 || 20–38 || L3
|- style="background:#fbb;" 
| 59 || June 11 || @ Cardinals || 4–5 || Wittgren (1–0) || Kuhnel (0–1) || — || Busch Stadium || 43,832 || 20–39 || L4
|- style="background:#bfb;"
| 60 || June 12 || @ Cardinals || 7–6 || Hoffman (1–0) || Hudson (4–3) || Díaz (2) || Busch Stadium || 43,083 || 21–39 || W1
|- style="background:#bfb;"
| 61 || June 13 || @ Diamondbacks || 5–4 || Minor (1–2) || Kelly (5–4) || Strickland (2) || Chase Field || 13,735 || 22–39 || W2
|- style="background:#bfb;"
| 62 || June 14 || @ Diamondbacks || 5–3  || Cessa (3–1) || Poppen (1–1) || Kuhnel (1) || Chase Field || 15,081 || 23–39 || W3
|- style="background:#fbb;" 
| 63 || June 15 || @ Diamondbacks || 4–7 || Ramirez (2–1) || Warren (2–3) || — || Chase Field || 14,917 || 23–40 || L1
|- style="background:#fbb;" 
| 64 || June 17 || Brewers || 4–5 || Lauer (6–2) || Detwiler (0–1) || Boxberger (1) || Great American Ball Park || 21,147 || 23–41 || L2
|- style="background:#fbb;" 
| 65 || June 18 || Brewers || 3–7 || Alexander (1–0) || Ashcraft (3–1) || — || Great American Ball Park || 25,071 || 23–42 || L3
|- style="background:#fbb;" 
| 66 || June 19 || Brewers || 3–6 || Houser (4–7) || Minor (1–3) || Williams (5) || Great American Ball Park || 25,001 || 23–43 || L4
|- style="background:#fbb;" 
| 67 || June 21 || Dodgers || 2–8 || Gonsolin (9–0) || Mahle (2–6) || — || Great American Ball Park || 18,476 || 23–44 || L5
|- style="background:#fbb;" 
| 68 || June 22 || Dodgers || 4–8 || Vesia (1–0) || Detwiler (0–2) || — || Great American Ball Park || 17,344 || 23–45 || L6
|- style="background:#fbb;" 
| 69 || June 23 || Dodgers || 5–10 || Kershaw (5–1) || Greene (3–8) || — || Great American Ball Park || 21,989 || 23–46 || L7
|- style="background:#bfb;" 
| 70 || June 24 || @ Giants || 4–2 || Ashcraft (4–1) || Cobb (3–3) || Strickland (3) || Oracle Park || 29,178 || 24–46 || W1
|- style="background:#fbb;" 
| 71 || June 25 || @ Giants || 2–9 || Webb (7–2) || Minor (1–4) || — || Oracle Park || 40,115 || 24–47 || L1
|- style="background:#bfb;"
| 72 || June 26 || @ Giants || 10–3 || Mahle (3–6) || DeSclafani (0–2) || — || Oracle Park || 32,285 || 25–47 || W1
|- style="background:#bfb;"
| 73 || June 28 || @ Cubs || 5–3 || Castillo (3–4) || Thompson (7–3) || Strickland (4) || Wrigley Field || 32,732 || 26–47 || W2
|- style="background:#fbb;" 
| 74 || June 29 || @ Cubs || 3–8 || Steele (3–5) || Greene (3–9) || — || Wrigley Field || 28,987 || 26–48 || L1
|- style="background:#fbb;" 
| 75 || June 30 || @ Cubs || 7–15 || Hendricks (4–6) || Ashcraft (4–2) || — || Wrigley Field || 32,318 || 26–49 || L2
|-

|- style="background:#fbb;" 
| 76 || July 1 || Braves || 1–9 || Fried (8–2) || Minor (1–5) || — || Great American Ball Park || 28,606 || 26–50 || L3
|- style="background:#fbb;" 
| 77 || July 2 || Braves || 1–4 || Strider (4–2) || Mahle (3–7) || Smith (4) || Great American Ball Park || 26,755 || 26–51 || L4
|- style="background:#bfb;" 
| 78 || July 3 || Braves || 4–3 || Strickland (1–2) || Minter (4–2) || — || Great American Ball Park || 21,418 || 27–51 || W1
|- style="background:#fbb;" 
| 79 || July 4 || Mets || 4–7 || Walker (7–2) || Greene (3–10) || Lugo (3) || Great American Ball Park || 19,533 || 27–52 || L1
|- style="background:#bfb;" 
| 80 || July 5 || Mets || 1–0 || Strickland (2–2) || Lugo (1–2) || — || Great American Ball Park || 13,487 || 28–52 || W1
|- style="background:#fbb;" 
| 81 || July 6 || Mets || 3–8  || Ottavino (3–2) || Moreta (0–2) || — || Great American Ball Park || 13,540 || 28–53 || L1
|- style="background:#fbb;"
| 82 || July 7  || Pirates || 2–4 || Contreras (3–2) || Minor (1–6) || Bednar (14) || Great American Ball Park || 13,086 || 28–54 || L2
|- style="background:#bfb;"
| 83 || July 7  || Pirates || 5–1 || Sanmartin (1–4) || Wilson (1–5) || — || Great American Ball Park || 9,575 || 29–54 || W1
|- style="background:#bfb;" 
| 84 || July 8 || Rays || 2–1  || Kuhnel (1–1) || Wisler (2–3) || — || Great American Ball Park || 26,529 || 30–54 || W2
|- style="background:#bfb;"
| 85 || July 9 || Rays || 5–4  || Hoffman (2–0) || Faucher (1–3) || — || Great American Ball Park || 33,927 || 31–54 || W3
|- style="background:#bfb;"
| 86 || July 10 || Rays || 10–5 || Lodolo (2–2) || Baz (1–3) || — || Great American Ball Park || 21,748 || 32–54 || W4
|- style="background:#bfb;" 
| 87 || July 12 || @ Yankees || 4–3 || Sanmartin (2–4) || Holmes (4–1) || Díaz (3) || Yankee Stadium || 40,235 || 33–54 || W5
|- style="background:#fbb;"
| 88 || July 13 || @ Yankees || 6–7  || King (6–1) || Díaz (2–1) || — || Yankee Stadium || 36,772 || 33–55 || L1
|- style="background:#bfb;" 
| 89 || July 14 || @ Yankees || 7–6  || Sanmartin (3–4) || Luetge (2–3) || Moreta (1) || Yankee Stadium || 41,311 || 34–55 || W1
|- style="background:#fbb;" 
| 90 || July 15 || @ Cardinals || 3–7 || Pallante (3–4) || Greene (3–11) || Helsley (8) || Busch Stadium || 41,221 || 34–56 || L1
|- style="background:#fbb;"
| 91 || July 16 || @ Cardinals || 3–11 || Mikolas (7–7) || Lodolo (2–3) || — || Busch Stadium || 41,014 || 34–57 || L2
|- style="background:#bbb;" 
| — || July 17 || @ Cardinals || colspan=8| Postponed (rain); Makeup: September 17
|- style="text-align:center; background:#bff;"
| ASG || July 19 || AL @ NL || 3–2 || Valdez (1–0) || Gonsolin (0–1) || Clase (1) || Dodger Stadium || 52,518 || N/A || N/A
|- style="background:#bfb;"
| 92 || July 22 || Cardinals || 9–5 || Sanmartin (4–4) || Wainwright (6–8) || — || Great American Ball Park || 25,547 || 35–57 || W1
|- style="background:#fbb;"
| 93 || July 23 || Cardinals || 3–6 || Matz (4–3) || Minor (1–7) || Helsley (9) || Great American Ball Park || 27,190 || 35–58 || L1
|- style="background:#bfb;"
| 94 || July 24 || Cardinals || 6–3 || Mahle (4–7) || Mikolas (7–8) || Strickland (5) || Great American Ball Park || 18,813 || 36–58 || W1
|- style="background:#bfb;"
| 95 || July 25 || Marlins || 11–2 || Lodolo (3–3) || Rogers (4–10) || — || Great American Ball Park || 12,948 || 37–58 || W2
|- style="background:#fbb;"
| 96 || July 26 || Marlins || 1–2 || López (7–5) || Greene (3–12) || Scott (13) || Great American Ball Park || 14,937 || 37–59 || L1
|- style="background:#bfb;" 
| 97 || July 27 || Marlins || 5–3 || Castillo (4–4) || Garrett (2–4) || Strickland (6) || Great American Ball Park || 11,387 || 38–59 || W1
|- style="background:#fbb;" 
| 98 || July 28 || Marlins || 6–7 || Pop (2–0) || Strickland (2–3) || Scott (14) || Great American Ball Park || 14,506 || 38–60 || L1
|- style="background:#fbb;" 
| 99 || July 29 || Orioles || 2–6 || Tate (2–3) || Farmer (0–1) || — || Great American Ball Park || 23,658 || 38–61 || L2
|- style="background:#bfb;" 
| 100 || July 30 || Orioles || 8–2 || Mahle (5–7) || Kremer (3–3) || — || Great American Ball Park || 29,104 || 39–61 || W1
|- style="background:#bfb;" 
| 101 || July 31 || Orioles || 3–2 || Díaz (3–1) || Bautista (3–3) || Farmer (1) || Great American Ball Park || 20,496 || 40–61 || W2
|-

|- style="background:#bfb;"
| 102 || August 1 || @ Marlins || 3–1 || Greene (4–12) || Luzardo (2–4) || Strickland (7) || LoanDepot Park || 7,701 || 41–61 || W3
|- style="background:#bfb;"
| 103 || August 2 || @ Marlins || 2–1 || Ashcraft (5–2) || Garrett (2–5) || Díaz (4) || LoanDepot Park || 8,188 || 42–61 || W4
|- style="background:#fbb;" 
| 104 || August 3 || @ Marlins || 0–3 || Alcántara (10–4) || Minor (1–8) || — || LoanDepot Park || 8,656 || 42–62 || L1
|- style="background:#fbb;" 
| 105 || August 5 || @ Brewers || 1–5 || Lauer (8–3) || Dugger (0–1) || Williams (7) || American Family Field || 33,239 || 42–63 || L2
|- style="background:#bfb;"
| 106 || August 6 || @ Brewers || 7–5 || Farmer (1–1) || Ashby (2–10) || — || American Family Field || 35,784 || 43–63 || W1
|- style="background:#bfb;"
| 107 || August 7 || @ Brewers || 4–2  || Strickland (3–3) || Williams (2–2) || Detwiler (1) || American Family Field || 40,063 || 44–63 || W2
|- style="background:#fbb;"
| 108 || August 8 || @ Mets || 1–5 || Bassitt (9–7) || Dunn (0–1) || — || Citi Field || 28,448 || 44–64 || L1
|- style="background:#fbb;"
| 109 || August 9 || @ Mets || 2–6 || Carrasco (13–4) || Minor (1–9) || — || Citi Field || 30,816 || 44–65 || L2
|- style="background:#fbb;"
| 110 || August 10 || @ Mets || 2–10 || Walker (10–3) || Zeuch (0–1) || — || Citi Field || 36,883 || 44–66 || L3
|- style="background:#fbb;"
| 111 || August 11 || Cubs || 2–4 || Smyly (5–6) || Lodolo (3–4) || Wick (7) || Field of Dreams || 7,823 || 44–67 || L4
|- style="background:#fbb;"
| 112 || August 13 || Cubs || 2–7 || Newcomb (1–0) || Ashcraft (5–3) || — || Great American Ball Park || 33,301 || 44–68 || L5
|- style="background:#bfb;"
| 113 || August 14 || Cubs || 8–5 || Kuhnel (2–1) || Espinoza (0–2) || Díaz (5) || Great American Ball Park || 23,959 || 45–68 || W1
|- style="background:#fbb;"
| 114 || August 15 || Phillies || 3–4 || Syndergaard (7–8) || Minor (1–10) || Domínguez (9) || Great American Ball Park || 14,635 || 45–69 || L1
|- style="background:#fbb;"
| 115 || August 16 || Phillies || 4–11 || Gibson (8–5) || Zeuch (0–2) || — || Great American Ball Park || 17,074 || 45–70 || L2
|- style="background:#bfb;"
| 116 || August 17 || Phillies || 1–0 || Díaz (4–1) || Domínguez (6–4) || — || Great American Ball Park || 13,622 || 46–70 || W1
|- style="background:#fbb;"
| 117 || August 19 || @ Pirates || 4–5 || Crowe (5–7) || Kuhnel (2–2) || — || PNC Park || 17,706 || 46–71 || L1
|- style="background:#bfb;"
| 118 || August 20 || @ Pirates || 10–1 || Dunn (1–1) || Beede (1–3) || — || PNC Park || 31,761 || 47–71 || W1
|- style="background:#bfb;"
| 119 || August 21 || @ Pirates || 9–5 || Minor (2–10) || Thompson (3–10) || — || PNC Park || 15,046 || 48–71 || W2
|- style="background:#fbb;"
| 120 || August 22 || @ Phillies || 1–4 || Syndergaard (8–8) || Cessa (3–2) || Bellatti (2) || Citizens Bank Park || 19,166 || 48–72 || L1
|- style="background:#fbb;"
| 121 || August 23 || @ Phillies || 6–7 || Hand (3–1) || Díaz (4–2) || — || Citizens Bank Park || 20,220 || 48–73 || L2
|- style="background:#fbb;"
| 122 || August 24 || @ Phillies || 5–7 || Sánchez (2–1) || Zeuch (0–3) || Robertson (18) || Citizens Bank Park || 24,400 || 48–74 || L3
|- style="background:#fbb;"
| 123 || August 25 || @ Phillies || 0–4 || Nola (9–10) || Dunn (1–2) || — || Citizens Bank Park || 21,123 || 48–75 || L4
|- style="background:#bfb;"
| 124 || August 26 || @ Nationals || 7–3 || Minor (3–10) || Cavalli (0–1) || — || Nationals Park || 31,256 || 49–75 || W1
|- style="background:#bfb;"
| 125 || August 27 || @ Nationals || 6–2 || Gibaut (1–0) || Espino (0–6) || Díaz (6) || Nationals Park || 30,325 || 50–75 || W2
|- style="background:#fbb;"
| 126 || August 28 || @ Nationals || 2–3 || Corbin (5–17) || Lodolo (3–5) || Finnegan (8) || Nationals Park || 31,411 || 50–76 || L1
|- style="background:#fbb;"
| 127 || August 29 || Cardinals || 4–13 || Stratton (7–4) || Anderson (0–1) || — || Great American Ball Park || 11,051 || 50–77 || L2
|- style="background:#bfb;"
| 128 || August 30 || Cardinals || 5–1 || Law (1–1) || Hudson (7–7) || — || Great American Ball Park || 13,271 || 51–77 || W1
|- style="background:#fbb;"
| 129 || August 31 || Cardinals || 3–5  || Pallante (6–4) || Anderson (0–2) || — || Great American Ball Park || 13,613 || 51–78 || L1
|-
|colspan=11 style="text-align:left"|
|-valign="top"

|- style="background:#bfb;"
| 130 || September 2 || Rockies || 3–2 || Díaz (5–2) || Colomé (2–7) || — || Great American Ball Park || 16,763 || 52–78 || W1
|- style="background:#bbb;" 
| — || September 3 || Rockies || colspan=8| Postponed (rain); Makeup: September 4
|- style="background:#fbb;" 
| 131 || September 4  || Rockies || 4–8 || Márquez (8–10) || Kuhnel (2–3) || — || Great American Ball Park ||  || 52–79 || L1
|- style="background:#bfb;" 
| 132 || September 4  || Rockies || 10–0 || Law (2–1) || Ureña (3–6) || — || Great American Ball Park || 23,060 || 53–79 || W1
|- style="background:#fbb;"
| 133 || September 6 || @ Cubs || 3–9 || Wesneski (1–0) || Gibaut (1–1) || — || Wrigley Field || 27,600 || 53–80 || L1
|- style="background:#bfb;"
| 134 || September 7 || @ Cubs || 7–1 || Minor (4–10) || Assad (0–1) || — || Wrigley Field || 27,945 || 54–80 || W1
|- style="background:#bfb;"
| 135 || September 8 || @ Cubs || 4–3 || Díaz (6–2) || Leiter Jr. (2–7) || Gibaut (1) || Wrigley Field || 23,910 || 55–80 || W2
|- style="background:#bfb;"
| 136 || September 9 || @ Brewers || 8–2 || Lodolo (4–5) || Alexander (2–3) || — || American Family Field || 33,660 || 56–80 || W3
|- style="background:#fbb;"
| 137 || September 10 || @ Brewers || 1–5 || Houser (6–9) || Anderson (0–3) || — || American Family Field || 34,615 || 56–81 || L1
|- style="background:#fbb;"
| 138 || September 11 || @ Brewers || 6–7 || Woodruff (10–4) || Dunn (1–3) || Williams (12) || American Family Field || 42,482 || 56–82 || L2
|- style="background:#fbb;"
| 139 || September 12 || Pirates || 3–6 || Wilson (3–8) || Minor (4–11) || Crowe (4) || Great American Ball Park || 12,083 || 56–83 || L3
|- style="background:#fbb;" 
| 140 || September 13  || Pirates || 1–6 || Oviedo (3–2) || Cessa (3–3) || — || Great American Ball Park || 9,338 || 56–84 || L4
|- style="background:#fbb;" 
| 141 || September 13  || Pirates || 0–1 || De Jong (5–2) || Espinal (0–1) || Underwood Jr. (1) || Great American Ball Park || 13,156 || 56–85 || L5
|- style="background:#fbb;" 
| 142 || September 14 || Pirates || 4–10 || Beede (2–5) || Lodolo (4–6) || Yajure (1) || Great American Ball Park || 11,449 || 56–86 || L6
|- style="background:#bfb;"
| 143 || September 15 || @ Cardinals || 3–2 || Anderson (1–3) || Mikolas (11–12) || Díaz (7) || Busch Stadium || 44,901 || 57–86 || W1
|- style="background:#fbb;"
| 144 || September 16 || @ Cardinals || 5–6 || Stratton (9–4) || Gibaut (1–2) || Helsley (18) || Busch Stadium || 47,118 || 57–87 || L1
|- style="background:#fbb;"
| 145 || September 17  || @ Cardinals || 1–5 || Hudson (8−7) || Minor (4−12) || — || Busch Stadium || 46,678 || 57–88 || L2
|- style="background:#fbb;" 
| 146 || September 17  || @ Cardinals || 0–1  || Matz (5–3) || Cruz (0–1) || — || Busch Stadium || 48,299 || 57–89 || L3
|- style="background:#bfb;" 
| 147 || September 18 || @ Cardinals || 3–0 || Cessa (4–3) || Montgomery (8–5) || Farmer (2) || Busch Stadium || 47,909 || 58–89 || W1
|- style="background:#fbb;" 
| 148 || September 20 || Red Sox || 3–5 || Bello (2–6) || Lodolo (4–7) || Schreiber (8) || Great American Ball Park || 16,698 || 58–90 || L1
|- style="background:#bfb;" 
| 149 || September 21 || Red Sox || 5–1 || Anderson (2–3) || Seabold (0–3) || Díaz (8) || Great American Ball Park || 13,074 || 59–90 || W1
|- style="background:#fbb;" 
| 150 || September 22 || Brewers || 1–5 || Woodruff (12–4) || Greene (4–13) || — || Great American Ball Park || 9,889 || 59–91 || L1
|- style="background:#fbb;" 
| 151 || September 23 || Brewers || 3–5 || Perdomo (3–0) || Cessa (4–4) || Williams (14) || Great American Ball Park || 16,658 || 59–92 || L2
|- style="background:#fbb;" 
| 152 || September 24 || Brewers || 2–10 || Burnes (11–8) || Ashcraft (5–4) || — || Great American Ball Park || 20,472 || 59–93 || L3
|- style="background:#bfb;" 
| 153 || September 25 || Brewers || 2–1 || Farmer (2–1) || Bush (2–3) || Díaz (9) || Great American Ball Park || 19,952 || 60–93 || W1
|- style="background:#fbb;" 
| 154 || September 26 || @ Pirates || 3–8 || Ramírez (2–1) || Law (2–2) || — || PNC Park || 8,766 || 60–94 || L1
|- style="background:#fbb;"
| 155 || September 27 || @ Pirates || 1–4 || Crowe (6–10) || Farmer (2–2) || Bednar (18) || PNC Park || 8,723 || 60–95 || L2
|- style="background:#fbb;" 
| 156 || September 28 || @ Pirates || 3–4  || Ramírez (3–1) || Díaz (6–3) || — || PNC Park || 9,127 || 60–96 || L3
|- style="background:#fbb;" 
| 157 || September 30 || @ Cubs || 1–6 || Sampson (4–5) || Ashcraft (5–5) || — || Wrigley Field || 24,297 || 60–97 || L4
|-

|- style="background:#fbb;"
| 158 || October 1 || @ Cubs || 1–2 || Miley (2–2) || Law (2–3) || Hughes (8) || Wrigley Field || 31,256 || 60–98 || L5
|- style="background:#fbb;" 
| 159 || October 2 || @ Cubs || 1–8 || Stroman (6–7) || Anderson (2–4) || — || Wrigley Field || 30,029 || 60–99 || L6
|- style="background:#bfb;" 
| 160 || October 3 || Cubs || 3–1 || Greene (5–13) || Wesneski (3–2) || Díaz (10) || Great American Ball Park || 11,291 || 61–99 || W1
|- style="background:#bfb;" 
| 161 || October 4 || Cubs || 3–2 || Díaz (7–3) || Hughes (2–3) || — || Great American Ball Park || 13,738 || 62–99 || W2
|- style="background:#fbb;"
| 162 || October 5 || Cubs || 2–15 || Alzolay (2–1) || Ashcraft (5–6) || — || Great American Ball Park || 12,437 || 62–100 || L1

|- style="text-align:center;"
! colspan=9 | Legend:       = Win       = Loss       = PostponementBold = Reds team member
|}

Roster

Statistics

Batting 
(through October 5, 2022)
Players in bold are on the active roster.
Note: G = Games played; AB = At bats; R = Runs; H = Hits; 2B = Doubles; 3B = Triples; HR = Home runs; RBI = Runs batted in; SB = Stolen bases; BB = Walks; K = Strikeouts; Avg. = Batting average; OBP = On-base percentage; SLG = Slugging percentage; TB = Total bases

Source

Pitching 
(through October 5, 2022)
Players in bold are on the active roster.
Note: W = Wins; L = Losses; ERA = Earned run average; WHIP = Walks plus hits per inning pitched; G = Games pitched; GS = Games started; SV = Saves; IP = Innings pitched; H = Hits allowed; R = Runs allowed; ER = Earned runs allowed; BB = Walks allowed; K = Strikeouts

Source

Farm system

References

External links
Cincinnati Reds 2022 schedule at MLB.com
2022 Cincinnati Reds season at Baseball Reference

2022
2022 Major League Baseball season
2022 in sports in Ohio